Lagocheirus rogersi is a species of beetle in the family Cerambycidae. There are two known subspecies of this insect: Lagocheirus rogersi panamensis and Lagocheirus rogersi hondurensis.

References

Lagocheirus